Townley is a surname.

Townley may also refer to:
Townley, Alabama
Townley, Indiana
Townley, Missouri
Townley (crater) on the Moon
Townley Grammar School, in London